Sheqi County is a county in the southwest of Henan province, China.

Administrative divisions
As 2012, this county is divided to 12 towns and 3 townships.
Towns

Townships
Chengjiao Township
Mopi Township
Tangzhuang Township

Climate

References

 
County-level divisions of Henan
Nanyang, Henan